The Chronicles of Amber is a series of fantasy novels  by American writer Roger Zelazny. The main series consists of two story arcs, each five novels in length. Additionally, there are a number of Amber short stories and other works. Four additional prequel books, authorized by the Zelazny estate following his death, were authored by John Gregory Betancourt.

The Amber stories take place in two contrasting "true" worlds, Amber and Chaos, and in shadow worlds (Shadows) that lie between the two. These shadows, including Earth, are parallel worlds that exist in — and were created from — the tension between the opposing magical forces of Amber and Chaos. The Courts of Chaos are situated at the very edge of an abyss. Members of the royal family of Amber, after walking in a Pattern that is central to Amber, can travel freely through the Shadows. While traveling (shifting) between Shadows, they can alter reality or create a new reality by choosing which elements of which Shadows to keep or add, and which to subtract. Nobles of the Courts of Chaos who have traversed the Logrus are similarly able to travel through Shadows.

The Chronicles
Ten Amber novels were written by Roger Zelazny. The series of books was published over the years from 1970 to 1991. Portions of the first novel, Nine Princes in Amber, had previously been published in Kallikanzaros (No. 1, June 1967, and No. 3, December 1967). The novels Sign of the Unicorn, The Hand of Oberon, and The Courts of Chaos first appeared in abridged, serialized versions in Galaxy Science Fiction. The Guns of Avalon and five later "Merlin Cycle" Amber novels were not serialized or excerpted.

Several Chronicles of Amber omnibus volumes have also been published, collecting the five novels of the original "Corwin Cycle" in one volume, the five novels of the "Merlin Cycle" in another volume, and later (in The Great Book of Amber) all ten novels in a single volume.

The Corwin cycle
The first five novels are narrated in the first person by Corwin, a prince of Amber, as he describes his adventures and life upon re-encountering his family after a loss of memory and an absence of centuries.

Nine Princes in Amber (1970)

Corwin wakes up from a coma in a hospital in New York with amnesia. He soon discovers that he's part of a superhuman royal family who can wander among infinite parallel worlds (called "shadows"), and who rule over the one true world, Amber. He meets members of this newly rediscovered family, and then later is shown and walks in the Pattern, a labyrinth inscribed in the dungeons of Castle Amber which gives the multiverse its order. Walking in the Pattern of Rebma (a city in Shadows that mirrors the true city of Amber, down to the smallest detail, including the pattern) restores Corwin's memory and his abilities to travel through Shadows. In alliance with his brother Bleys, he attempts to conquer Amber, which is ruled by his elder brother Eric. Eric took power after the disappearance of their father, Oberon. Their attempt fails. Bleys falls from the side of the Kolvir mountain and Corwin is captured, blinded and imprisoned. Thanks to his genetic regenerative ability, his eyes regrow, and he regains his vision. Dworkin Barimen, the mad sorcerer who created the pattern, enters Corwin's prison through the walls of Corwin's prison cell, and eventually draws on the wall the door through which Corwin escapes.

The Guns of Avalon (1972)

Corwin has escaped the dungeons of Amber, where he was imprisoned by his hated brother Eric, who had seized the throne of Amber. All of Corwin's siblings believe that guns cannot function in Amber, as gunpowder is inert there. But Corwin has secret knowledge: in the shadow world of Avalon, where he once ruled, there exists a jeweler's rouge that will function in Amber as gunpowder should. Corwin plans to raise a legion of shadow soldiers and arm them with automatic rifles from the shadow world Earth. While gathering these forces Corwin discovers a more sinister problem growing among the shadows. He meets Dara, a woman claiming to be his great-grandniece, and later discovers a threat to Amber: a black road which runs across universes from the Courts of Chaos to Amber. With his newly trained army, Corwin marches on Castle Amber only to find it already under siege. Eric is mortally wounded and passes the Jewel of Judgment to Corwin, making Corwin Regent. The immediate danger passes, but Dara threatens greater peril after walking the Pattern and revealing herself to be a creature of the Courts of Chaos, intent on destroying both Amber and the Shadows.

Sign of the Unicorn (1975)

Eric is dead, and Corwin now rules Amber as Regent. But someone has murdered their brother Caine and framed Corwin. This leads to questions about other missing members of the royal family. Corwin's brother, Random, tells of his attempts to rescue their brother, Brand, and Corwin decides to find out what happened to the latter. After many intrafamily exchanges, Brand is rescued but is stabbed by one of the family in the attempt. In the midst of the ensuing intrigue, an assassination attempt is made on Corwin, and he finds himself incapacitated on Earth. Before returning to Amber, he hides the Jewel of Judgment on Earth. After Brand recovers, he tells Corwin of several incidents leading up to his capture. Corwin travels to Tir-na Nóg'th, the mysterious, moonlit Amber-in-the-sky where he hopes to gain insight into the situation, and upon his return finds himself at the Primal Pattern rather than Amber.

The Hand of Oberon (1976)

Corwin finds the Primal Pattern damaged, with a dark stain obscuring part of it. On further investigation, it is found that the blood of one of the members of his family has created the stain. Corwin descends back to the dungeons and meets with Dworkin, who explains how the Pattern might be repaired. After being chased from the Pattern, Corwin eventually discovers that Brand is responsible for the damage and that he now has the Jewel of Judgment. Corwin must now prevent Brand from attuning himself to the jewel, or Brand's plot to destroy the Pattern will succeed. Corwin and his family band together to prevent this, eventually recover the jewel, and discover that their father Oberon, the true King of Amber, still lives.

Roger Zelazny makes a brief cameo appearance in the book as a guard in a dungeon, smoking a pipe and working on a novel which may or may not be The Chronicles of Amber itself.

The Courts of Chaos (1978)

Oberon, having resumed the throne, organizes an assault on the Courts of Chaos. Oberon plans to repair the Primal Pattern at the cost of his life and offers the throne to Corwin with Dara as his Queen. Corwin refuses and is tasked to bring the Jewel of Judgment across the shadows to the battle that will ensue after the Pattern is redrawn. He sets off along the black road and is soon pursued by Brand and a great storm. Through the storm and across the multiverse he comes to doubt his father's success. As he approaches the Courts of Chaos, he is assailed by fantastic beings who try to dissuade him, and he finally decides that his father must have failed. Corwin then creates a new Pattern and uses it to get to the courts but has not the strength to prevent Brand stealing the Jewel from him in the process. In a final confrontation with Brand, the Jewel of Judgment is stolen and lost. Brand is killed - by Caine, revealed to have faked his own death earlier by murdering a "shadow" version of himself and leaving the body to be found shot through the heart and throat, Brand falls off a precipice into the Abyss, taking Deirdre with him in the process. The Jewel is recovered by the unicorn who bestows it on Random, who is then accepted as the new King. The Trumps and multiverse are restored, and Corwin relates the story of the first five novels to his son Merlin. Corwin speculates that his own Pattern remains and may lead to its own series of Shadows.

The Merlin Cycle
The next five novels focus on Merlin, Corwin's son. These stories are held by some fans to be less of a fantasy classic than the first five due to the difference in writing style, direction and setting. One criticism of the sequence is that it revolved around the dealing with and acquisition of ever more powerful artifacts and entities, in a kind of technological/magical arms race.

Whereas Corwin of the first series was a product of the late 1960s and 1970s and was more of a cross between a hardboiled detective in the vein of Raymond Chandler and a Highlander-like immortal with centuries of experience fighting his way through the stories, Merlin (a product of the late 1980s and early 1990s when computers had become commonplace) is a youthful hacker / magician finding himself in increasingly complex situations in the vein of modern hacker protagonists. The series is a coming of age for Merlin with his heritage as a Prince of Chaos and Amber.

Trumps of Doom (1985)

Merlin has been studying computer science on Earth while constructing a secret project called Ghostwheel, a sentient computer based on the Trumps, which Merlin hopes will be able to locate Corwin, who vanished after visiting the Courts of Chaos in the previous novel. Merlin discovers the body of his ex-girlfriend Julia, apparently killed by beasts from another shadow, and subsequently finds himself in sorcerous combat with a lady named Jasra, who has a poisonous sting in her bite. More unnerving is that his best friend Luke apparently knows about both Ghostwheel and Merlin's connection to Amber. He eventually returns to Amber, which is in mourning: the news has just come that Caine has been murdered, and Bleys injured, by a mystery assassin with a rifle – an assassin who demonstrates (with a thrown bomb at Caine's funeral, which misses any other family members) that he has access to something with explosive properties in Amber (which had previously been thought impossible). After the funeral, King Random orders Merlin to shut down Ghostwheel, but the artifact shows it is capable of self-defense, even against its creator, who is saved by the unexpected appearance of Luke – who thus proves, with the ability to traverse Shadow, that he too is no ordinary human. He soon finds that Luke is in fact Rinaldo, son of Brand of Amber, and has been responsible for yearly attempts on his life, on the anniversary of Luke's discovery of Brand's death. Luke imprisons Merlin in a cave of blue crystal which negates his magic abilities and from which he cannot escape.

Trumps of Doom won the Locus Award for Best Fantasy Novel in 1985.

Blood of Amber (1986)

Merlin escapes from the blue crystal cave, meets and confronts Jasra, nearly taking her prisoner, but is forced to retreat when she calls in reinforcements using the Trumps. Further mystery ensues back on Earth when several people who apparently knew a lot more about Merlin than they should, turn out to have no memory of previous meetings. Merlin traces his way back to his first confrontation with Jasra, where he finds himself at a magical fort, the Keep of the Four Worlds, a nexus of magical energies which has recently fallen under the control of a mysterious, blue-masked sorcerer calling himself "Mask", who seems to have a vendetta against Merlin. However, the Keep is also currently under siege by Dalt the Mercenary, a known enemy of Amber and friend of Luke/Rinaldo. A meeting with a deserter reveals that Jasra (the previous owner of the Keep – now presumably deposed) is Luke/Rinaldo's mother. Merlin returns to Amber, ventures out into Amber City, escapes an assassination attempt, and is saved by Caine's mistress, Vinta Bayle – who, also, appears to know more than she ought about him. Merlin then finds himself having to rescue Luke from Dalt, the two having apparently come to blows. Luke reveals that Jasra has indeed lost power and is now a prisoner – and has the cheek to ask for Merlin's help. "Vinta" reveals that she is not what she seems but is a being that has apparently appeared to Merlin in "possession" of several different bodies. Luke ends up in the crystal cave himself – and Merlin, after yet another uncanny encounter with a shape-shifting werewolf (which escapes, minus an ear and with severe burns) and that appears to be backed by Mask. Merlin decides to gain leverage over Luke by "rescuing" Jasra without Luke's help, and then taking Jasra as a prisoner in Amber. He confronts Mask, escapes with the now-petrified Jasra, and returns to Amber, where an unusual Trump summoning imprisons him in the Mad Hatter's tea party from Wonderland.

Blood of Amber was nominated for the Locus Award for Best Fantasy Novel in 1987.

Sign of Chaos (1987)

Merlin realises that Wonderland, where he and Luke are trapped, is an LSD-induced hallucination made real by Luke's powers overshadow. It is Luke who has dropped the acid – he, too, having been taken prisoner in an independent attempt to rescue Jasra, and having apparently been given it as an experiment. He is ambushed by a creature from Chaos, a Fire Angel, but defeats it with the help of a Jabberwock and a vorpal sword. He leaves Luke to sober up and seeks his stepbrother Mandor, who thinks that their half-brother Jurt may be at least one of the assassins trying to kill Merlin – right now, most likely, for headship of the House of Sawall once its current lord dies, since Mandor (the eldest son) has stepped aside, leaving that office to be disputed between Merlin and Jurt (who was indeed the werewolf from earlier). They meet up with Fiona and discover that the Logrus is making an attempt to damage Corwin's Pattern. But Merlin refuses to help Mandor and Fiona learn more, and returns to Amber, only to be embroiled in diplomatic controversy: in order to avoid Luke's possible accession to the throne of the Shadow kingdom Kashfa, Random is playing politics to put his own candidate on the throne, and the neighbouring kingdom of Begma objects to that particular candidate's territorial ambitions. The Begman duke's elder daughter Coral and Luke's old friend Dalt the Mercenary are both revealed to be bastard Amberites, sired by Oberon out of wedlock: Coral walks the Pattern and disappears completely, apparently held prisoner by it. Dalt challenges Amber with an armed force, demanding Luke be surrendered to him as prisoner, but Luke has sworn off his vendetta and is under Queen Vialle's protection. Negotiations result in an arranged fistfight between Dalt and Luke, which Dalt wins and captures Luke. Coral's younger sister Nayda is revealed to be possessed by the mysterious body-possessing "t'yiga" demon which had previously been Vinta Bayle (and, for a short while, several other people on Earth, in "Trumps of Doom"): but since the real Nayda actually died of a long-standing heart condition just as the t'yiga possessed her (possession is normally harmless), it is now trapped in her form permanently. Merlin calls in Mandor to imprison the t'yiga, which turns out (a) to have been sent with orders to act as a bodyguard to Merlin, by an unknown sponsor, and (b) reveals that Jurt is in league with Mask and is trying to gain power from the Keep of the Four Worlds in the same way that Brand did, and become a Living Trump. Merlin and Mandor free Jasra, since Jasra is Mask's enemy, and together they wrest the Keep of the Four Worlds from Jurt and Mask. Mask is wounded by Merlin, but then is revealed that "he" is in fact Merlin's ex-girlfriend Julia, whom he had thought dead.

Sign of Chaos was nominated for the Locus Award for Best Fantasy Novel in 1988.

Knight of Shadows (1989)

Jasra is left in charge of the Keep of the Four Worlds, where she had ruled before – as Julia's teacher, before Julia decided to outwit her and take over. She turns out to be exactly the right person to leave in charge there, as she does not wish for the power of the Fount of the Four Worlds herself, but is quite happy to prevent others using it, since gaining its power destroyed the last of Brand's humanity, and she appears to have genuinely loved him, and lost him to his power-lust. Merlin tries to use Trump magic to locate Coral – with the help of Mandor, Jasra and even his own creation Ghostwheel, with whom he is back on good terms – but is ambushed by various ghostly constructs of people that have walked the Pattern and Logrus, and even by Corwin's most recent Pattern-ghost (from his own Pattern, not the Pattern of Amber), and finds himself drawn into a struggle between the Logrus, the fundamental power of chaos, and the Pattern, the fundamental power of order.

It is revealed that the Pattern, and its chaotic counterpart the Logrus, are sentient, and wish Merlin to choose a side to tip the balance of the multiverse towards one or the other – with other Pattern- and Logrus-ghosts also taking part in the "trial" to influence him one way or the other. He attempts to refuse the "test" but is confronted by the Powers That Be themselves, the Unicorn of Order and Serpent of Chaos. They try to make him choose between them using ghosts of family members who have traversed their two paths. He attempts to walk the route of neutrality to avoid choosing sides, but ends up being tricked into taking sides twice – firstly by having a Chaos dagger planted on him as he sleeps before attempting to take the middle path in a three-way choice between the extremes of Order and Chaos (this is rather appropriate: he would rather aid neither side, but his chosen method is usually the magic of Chaos), and secondly he is coerced into aiding the Pattern to strengthen its position in Shadows, while rescuing Coral from her imprisonment.

During the trial he somehow obtains possession of the Jewel of Judgement: the attempt to return it to Castle Amber provokes a confrontation between the Pattern and Logrus themselves, causing a mighty explosion in which Mandor suffers a broken arm and Coral loses an eye. The ty'iga demon in Nayda's body escapes and tries to return the Jewel to the Logrus, but is captured by Ghostwheel – which, after removing both Nayda and the Jewel, passes its own synthetic "consciousness" through the Jewel, thus traversing the Pattern. Coral's damaged eye is operated on by Dworkin, who replaces it with the Jewel of Judgement. Merlin investigates Brand's old quarters, and finds his old sword Werewindle, and a mysterious and powerful "spikard" ring, which he keeps. Random sends him to the kingdom of Kashfa as the Amberite representative at a coronation ... that of none other than Luke, who is crowned as "King Rinaldo I", having overthrown Random's candidate Duke Arkans, in a largely bloodless coup. Since he has a fairly legitimate claim on the throne himself, is on better terms with his neighbours (Begma, who objected to Duke Arkans), and has given up his vendetta on Amber, Random is letting things stand. Further complications ensue when it turns out that Coral – now Merlin's lover – is actually Luke's long-forgotten wife following a diplomatic arranged marriage in childhood (although Luke seems willing enough to have it annulled in the future). Merlin goes to present Luke with Werewindle as a memento of his father, but they are ambushed by Jurt (again). Jurt is defeated but steals Werewindle as he flees.

Prince of Chaos (1991)

Merlin returns to his birthplace in the Courts of Chaos in order to solve the existential riddle in which he is involved – to find that he is suddenly a lot closer to the throne of Chaos itself than he thought, King Swayvill having finally died of a long-standing illness (aggravated, it is said, by the death curse of Eric of Amber), and many other candidates having either been assassinated or dropped out, which pushes his own house of Sawall unexpectedly to the forefront. Of course, besides there being two other candidates from rival houses, this pushes Jurt very close to the succession too. In a conversation with his mother Dara – mistress of Corwin once, and a descendant of Benedict, also from the royal house of Chaos – he finds that she was the one who sent the ty'iga demon which is now Coral's sister Nayda (and appears to be developing something of an affection for Luke). Merlin realizes he is but a pawn in the hands of the powerful and cynical superpowers that rule the universe, that neither the Pattern nor the Logrus (or their manifestations as Unicorn and Serpent) care much about their "minions", and that someone or something wants him to rule Chaos – and that others will try to manipulate him when he is.

Merlin – and a Pattern-ghost of Luke – are both adopted by Corwin's Pattern (which has previously rejected Fiona), at the insistence of a Pattern-ghost of Corwin himself, as it appears that his own Pattern is also sentient and resisting incursions from both the Logrus and Amber's Pattern – and taking a hand in the conflict between the two. It becomes apparent that the real Corwin is held prisoner by Dara herself – ironically, in a chapel devoted to Corwin (chapels devoted to Amberites having apparently become a popular cult in Chaos after the Patternfall War: Jurt worshipped Brand, House Hendrake idolised Benedict, and Mandor's patron was Fiona). Jurt, frightened by the power politics, declares a truce with Merlin, and calls off his own vendetta – suggesting that Dara and Mandor intend, themselves, to manipulate Merlin when becomes King, after first putting him on the throne. The assassination of the two remaining candidates throws things into confusion: Coral is kidnapped by agents of Chaos (who want her because the Jewel of Judgement is her eye), and pursued by Merlin and Jurt, who call on the assistance of Luke, Dalt and Nayda: they find themselves having to fight agents of the Pattern as well as the Logrus to rescue her, and finally confront the Pattern itself and threaten to damage it by spilling their Amberite blood on it, if it does not back off from their conflict (the four others are sent safely away while Luke remains: contact is lost just after he says "Shit, I spilled it!").

Merlin rescues his father, Corwin, and hides him in Jurt's quarters, and also discovers that the Spikard Ring he found in Brand's quarters was a trap, meant to bring him under Mandor and Dara's influence – except the plan was anticipated by Bleys (who was thought to be in hiding, recovering from his injury four books ago), who replaced it with another identical spikard which Dara and Mandor did not control (previously held by an estranged Amberite, a son of Oberon called Delwin). In the Courts of Chaos, Merlin uses Ghostwheel (which has by now traversed the Logrus as well as the Pattern), his own Spikard, and all his magical powers in the final fight for survival: finally declaring – and forcing Dara and Mandor to accept – that although he did not want to rule, if forced to do so, it will not be as anyone's puppet. Thus, both the Pattern and Logrus are forestalled for a time, in their attempts to escalate their conflict: while Corwin begins the journey back to Amber, Merlin – who wants peace with Amber – returns to Chaos to await his coronation.

Short stories
For the limited 1985 edition of Trumps of Doom, Zelazny wrote a prologue that details Merlin's passage through the Logrus.

After completing the Merlin Cycle, Zelazny wrote five Amber short stories, in which he began to tease the threads of the story into a new configuration. Zelazny died shortly after completing the last of these short stories, which were collected in Manna from Heaven (2003), along with the Trumps of Doom prologue and 16 non-Amber stories.

A separate and unfinished sixth short story, "A Secret of Amber", was an informal collaboration, co-written in alternating sections by Zelazny and Ed Greenwood over a period of years. It was published in Amberzine in 2005, and later anthologized in The Collected Stories of Roger Zelazny, Volume 6: The Road to Amber, published by NESFA Press in 2009.

Although several orders for these stories have been proposed by fans, Zelazny himself commented that the correct order for the stories is the order in which they were written:

 "A Secret of Amber" (Amberzine #12–15, March 2005)
 "The Salesman's Tale" (Amberzine No. 6, by Phage Press, February 1994 and Ten Tales, edited by John Dunning, 1994)
 "Blue Horse, Dancing Mountains" (Wheel of Fortune, edited by Roger Zelazny, 1995)
 "The Shroudling and the Guisel" (Realms of Fantasy, October 1994)
 "Coming to a Cord" (Pirate Writings, Number 7, 1995)
 "Hall of Mirrors" (Castle Fantastic, edited by John DeChancie and Martin Greenberg, March 1996)

The latter five stories told a linked tale from several viewpoints. Zelazny had planned to write more, and to eventually publish a collection of Amber short stories.

Dawn of Amber series

Several years after Zelazny's death, his estate authorized a new series of Amber novels, and John Gregory Betancourt was selected as the writer. Betancourt's Dawn of Amber series, which took its name from the title of the first volume, is a prequel to Zelazny's work, taking place centuries or millennia before Nine Princes in Amber. It is told from the point of view of Corwin's father Oberon, and like Zelazny's novels, the series was narrated in first person.

Four novels, out of five that had been planned, were published by ibooks:
 The Dawn of Amber (2002)
 Chaos and Amber (2003)
 To Rule in Amber (2004)
 Shadows of Amber (2005)

Having ended the fourth book on a cliffhanger, Betancourt never wrote the planned and scheduled fifth volume, Sword of Chaos. After Byron Preiss, the owner of ibooks, died, the publishing company  filed for bankruptcy, and Betancourt announced in February 2006 that the series had been canceled. After a meeting with the publisher's new owner, Betancourt had brief hopes of renewed interest in the series from ibooks, but in August 2007 he announced his conclusion that the project was dead.

Betancourt stated that one of his primary motivations for agreeing to write the new books was to keep Zelazny's books and stories alive and in print, and to prevent them from fading into obscurity. He cited Robert E. Howard's Conan, Edgar Rice Burroughs's Tarzan, and Sir Arthur Conan Doyle's Sherlock Holmes as examples of how later authors had successfully continued and extended the stories of iconic characters long after their creators had died. In response to concerns that the Dawn of Amber series seemed to contradict some ideas or rules of the Amber universe as stated in Zelazny's original ten books, Betancourt stated in an interview that some of those contradictions would not prove valid by the end of his series.

The decision by Zelazny's literary executor to authorize a continuation of the Amber series was criticized by several acquaintances of Zelazny, including writers George R. R. Martin, Walter Jon Williams, and Neil Gaiman. They asserted that Zelazny had been quite averse to the idea of a "shared" Amber setting, and that he had clearly stated he did not want any others writing Amber stories. Gaiman wrote:

The series received a critical response from some Zelazny fans, who responded negatively to Betancourt's writing style and perceived lack of characterization, and considered his work to be fan fiction. The focus on Oberon also disappointed those who, after reading Zelazny's Merlin cycle and Amber short stories, believed that Zelazny had instead been planning another series of books to wrap up matters that he had left hanging. Zelazny's short stories, while tying up some of the loose ends, at the same time had opened doors to potential new stories going forward in the Amber universe, rather than a prequel.

Audio editions and other adaptations

Audiobooks 
Sunset Productions did audio versions of Roger Zelazny reading the novels (except where noted), and produced them with sound effects. Sunset was bought out by Americana Publishing in 2002.

 Nine Princes in Amber (abridged February 1992, unabridged April 1998)
 The Guns of Avalon (abridged February 1992, unabridged November 1998)
 Sign of the Unicorn (abridged September 1992, unabridged December 1998)
 The Hand of Oberon (abridged October 1992, unabridged 1999) (last portion of the unabridged version read by Bruce Watson)
 The Courts of Chaos (abridged only January 1993, unsure of unabridged date)
 Trumps of Doom (abridged April 1993, unsure of unabridged date)
 Blood of Amber (abridged July 1993, unsure of unabridged date)
 Sign of Chaos (abridged November 1994, unabridged 2002)
 Knight of Shadows (abridged only) (October 1996)
 Prince of Chaos (abridged only) (read by Bruce Watson) (December 1998)

The National Library Service for the Blind and Physically Handicapped also created unabridged recorded versions of The Chronicles of Amber novels, including a 1979 recording of Nine Princes in Amber, read by Michael Moodie, and a later recording of Prince of Chaos, read by John Stratton.

Unabridged recordings created for the Canadian National Institute for the Blind included a 2001 recording of Nine Princes in Amber read by Richard Nazarewich.

In 2012, Audible released brand new recordings of The Chronicles of Amber, with Alessandro Juliani reading the first five books (the Corwin cycle) and Wil Wheaton reading the last five books (the Merlin cycle).

Graphic novel adaptations 
The first two Amber books, Nine Princes in Amber and The Guns of Avalon, were adapted by Terry Bisson into graphic novels. They were published in 1996, each in three parts.

Reference works
There are two published guides to Amber:
 Roger Zelazny's Visual Guide to Castle Amber by Roger Zelazny and Neil Randall (1988)
 The Complete Amber Sourcebook by Theodore Krulik (Avon Books, New York, 1996)

Games

Authorized games 
In 1985, Telarium published the interactive fiction computer game Nine Princes in Amber, based on the first two books of the series.

Two authorized adventure books based on Amber, similar in concept to Neil Randall's Choose Your Own Adventure series, were published in 1988:
 Seven No-Trump (1988), subtitled "A Crossroads Adventure"
 The Black Road War (1988), subtitled "Combat Command"

Erick Wujcik created the Amber Diceless Roleplaying Game, with two authorized publications:
 Amber Diceless Role-playing (1991)
 Shadow Knight (1995)

Other games 
The online multiplayer role-playing game  was based in the Amber universe.

Lost Souls is a multiplayer medieval fantasy MUD in which Amber is the center of the cosmos and the Courts of Chaos is the outermost of the outer planes; Amberite and Chaosborn are among the playable races.

Zangband is a single-player roguelike computer game with a setting, magic system, and race options that are loosely derived from Zelazny's Amber multiverse, with the Serpent of Chaos as its final adversary.

History, setting, and backstory of the Amber Multiverse 
The series is based on the concept of parallel worlds, domination over them being fought between the kingdoms at the extreme ends of Shadow—Amber, the one true world of Order, and the Courts of Chaos. Amberites of royal blood - those descended from Oberon (and ultimately his parents: Dworkin, formerly of the Courts of Chaos, and the Unicorn of Order herself) — are able to "walk in Shadow", mentally willing changes to occur around them. These changes are, in effect, representative of the Shadow-walker passing through different realities. There are apparently infinite realities, and the characters in the novels are not sure if these different universes are created as one walks through Shadow, or if they already exist and a Shadow-walker is able to slip from one to another. In the Merlin cycle there are references to the Wheeler–Everett interpretation of quantum-mechanics and the Ghostwheel created by Merlin is said to "shuffle" through Shadows, suggesting that the multiverse exists independently, although this is never explicitly stated.

Within this multiverse, Zelazny deals with some interesting philosophical concepts about the nature of existence, compares and contrasts the ideas of Order and Chaos, and plays with the laws of physics—they can differ from Shadow to Shadow; for instance, gunpowder does not ignite in Amber, which is why the characters all carry swords. Other Shadows have green skies and blue suns, cities of glass, and worlds out of our own fiction can come to life.

The geography of Amber
The Castle and City of Amber rest upon a shoulder of Kolvir, a mountain which dominates the land and sea around it. The city lies below the castle and extends down the mountain's slopes to a seaport. Part of the eastern face of Kolvir is a cliff, thousands of feet high, which can be climbed using stone steps. These form a switchback stair, a path that is broad enough for two men abreast at the bottom, but soon narrows, wide enough for only for a single person. There are no railings. Below the stairs are a tiger-striped beach and the sea, and the cliff face is riddled with sea caves. Out to sea and to the southeast of Amber lies first the City of Rebma, and then the Isle of Cabra, noted for its lighthouse.

To the north of Amber lie various estates, farms, and small villages and communities, as well as a small port (Balyesport). The great forest of Arden lies to the north, west and south of Kolvir. Also to the south is The Vale of Garnath. This is a lush forest, but "not so thickly or massively wooded as the Arden", and is where the River Oisen travels to the sea. It is also through Garnath that the forces of Chaos eventually come to attack Amber, using their Black Road. Another important southern location, within the Forest of Arden, is the Grove of the Unicorn.

Prince Julian is generally responsible for patrolling the land approaches to Amber, especially through the Arden, while Princes Caine and Gérard initially shared responsibility for the fleets protecting Amber's seas. Since Amber "casts Shadow but is not of it", walking in Shadow was not possible in the immediate environs of the City or Kolvir. It was necessary to gain some distance from these locations in order to walk in Shadow, traveling to or from other worlds. This usually meant traveling by sea, or through the Forest of Arden. This is why the sea patrols and Julian's force in Arden were effective.

Reflections of Amber
Amber has two reflections or counterparts. The city of Rebma (Amber spelled backwards) lies under the sea off the coast. Markers on the beach point the way to an underwater stairway (named  Faiella-Bionin) which descends to the city. The stairway and city are magical, allowing normal breathing, talking, etc. -- but also allowing one to swim if desired. Leaving the areas of magic returns one to normal water, with the potential of drowning or being crushed by water pressure. Rebma is ruled by Queen Moire. Most inhabitants are a sea people, not shadows of Amberites, and are slightly different in form from humans. They can be resentful of Amber, particularly when strife in Amber causes ripples of trouble in their own home. In times of peace Amberites may visit freely. It was during one such time that Random seduced and abandoned Moire's daughter Morganthe, leading her to commit suicide after she bore his son, Martin. Rebma contains a copy of the Pattern, a mirror image of the one in Amber.

On moonlit nights, the ghostly city of Tir-na Nog'th (cf. Tír na nÓg) appears in the sky above Kolvir. It is an imperfect reflection of Amber, with inhabitants that are shadows and ghosts of people, including those who once, might have, or never existed. Like Rebma, Tir-na Nog'th  is reached by a stair, the bottom three steps of which are of stone rooted on Kolvir, with the rest of the stairs being of the same nature as the city itself. As long as the moon is not obscured, the stairway and the city are solid enough to stand on. Amberites visit the ghost city to seek insights and portents of the future. The passage of time and spatial distances differ in Tir-na Nog'th, versus the world below. When visiting there, safety suggests staying in contact with someone via a Trump, since the city may disappear without warning if a cloud passes across the moon. Again like Rebma, Tir-na Nog'th also contains a complete copy of the Pattern (but this copy isn't reversed, as is Rebma's). Tir-na Nog'th is visited by Corwin in a crucial development of his story.

Characters in the Amber novels

Ultimately, Amber focuses on a dysfunctional family that is at the center of a cosmic war between many powers. Nine princes and four princesses of Amber, including Prince Corwin as narrator of the first book series, try to deal with the disappearance of Oberon, their father, and an apparent need for succession of the throne. No one trusts anyone, everyone appears to be ready to backstab anyone else (often figuratively), and everyone seems genuinely interested in only one thing: himself or herself.

In this respect, the Amber series could perhaps be best described as a philosophical, metaphysical, magical, mystical, fantasy political thriller. It has all those things, all wrapped around a cast of characters who are conniving, paranoid, dysfunctional, self-involved, and often heartless.

All of the princes and princesses of Amber have super-human strength and regenerative capabilities. For example, Random and Corwin are able to pick up a car that had become stuck on a soft shoulder and place it back on the road, and Corwin is able to regenerate his eyes after they are burned out, although it takes him almost five years. Corwin seems to have the fastest regenerative capabilities in the royal family, something he contemplates after his escape from the dungeons of Amber.

Magical powers and objects

The Pattern and the Logrus
At the two poles of existence are the symbols of Order and Chaos—The Pattern and The Logrus, respectively. Each, when negotiated, gives a person the ability to walk in shadow—across the different possible universes. The Pattern is a single, intertwined curve, laid out in a twisting labyrinth-like design, in size larger than a football field. The Logrus is described as a shifting, three-dimensional obstacle course. Amber's Pattern is located in caverns deep underneath the royal palace.

Initially, readers learn there is the Pattern in Amber, and copies in Rebma and Tir-na Nog'th. Later, more become evident: e.g., there are imperfect or "broken" copies in other Shadows, and that Amber's Pattern itself is a close shadow of a hidden Primal Pattern. These imperfect copies exist in shadows close to Amber, with the first three being the least dangerous to use, but with the danger increasing the further one is from the original. Navigating Broken Patterns can give an individual some access to magical energies, but it is "foolish" to attempt to use for such purposes any Broken Pattern further than the ninth one from Amber.

The Logrus is not introduced until the sixth book of the Amber series (The Trumps of Doom). Merlin's walking of the Logrus appears in a prologue to the initial hardcover edition of the book. We do not see any other instances of a character negotiating the Logrus. The Prologue has Merlin bleeding and experiencing odd sensory inputs. Later we learn that walking the Logrus can leave one mentally unstable for a while afterwards, but this "usually" passes. The Logrus is also described as containing the skeletal remains of those who tried to walk it, but failed.

The Trumps
In the Amber universe, the word "trump" is used as both a noun and a verb. As a noun, it properly refers to a specialized type of hand-drawn tarot card depicting a person or a place. As a verb, it refers to using such a card for teleportation.

The original tarot decks used by Amberites had some or all of their Major Arcana cards replaced (or possibly augmented) with images of the royal family, and of at least one location, Castle Amber. These original decks were created by Dworkin, and a deck was given to each family member after they first walked the Pattern. Physically, these cards are cool to the touch. The decks may be used like normal tarots for divination, as Corwin does shortly after meeting one of his brothers.

The Trumps have the magical attribute of facilitating a psychic link to the person or place depicted on the card, enabling instant communication, travel, and even attack. If the card depicts a location, the user is able to teleport to that location. If the card depicts a person, the user concentrates on the image and attempts to reach out to the person to initiate contact. The recipient of a Trump contact does not need to have a card in their possession. An attempted contact may be blocked or declined by the receiving party, by an act of concentration. A variety of other circumstances can also impede or prevent Trump contact from being made, including distance and time-flow differences across Shadows, as well as unconsciousness, amnesia, and magical characteristics of a particular location.

If contact through a Trump is successful, both parties are able to talk to each other, and even see some of each other's surroundings. Either party may end a Trump communication, either by passing their hand over the card, or by an effort of will. During the contact, each person has the option of reaching through the link to make physical contact, generally for the purpose of pulling the other person voluntarily to their own physical location. This is sometimes called "trumping" a person to the other location. In some cases, one can also travel via Trump to the other person's location without the other's consent or assistance, as long as the contact remains open (e.g., Dalt's attempt in Blood of Amber to come through a Trump held by Merlin, which failed only after Merlin summoned the Logrus to sever the contact). A Trump contact also creates a potential opening for an attack by either party on the other, either with a weapon, or by using the link in an attempt to dominate the other by sheer force of ego and will. This can result in immobilization or worse for the victim of the attack.

To an observer who witnesses a person trumping to another location, the person becomes two-dimensional before disappearing, and there is a prismatic aftereffect. In Trumps of Doom, Merlin also mentions sensing a kind of electrical charge as Jasra trumps into a room where he waits.

Further details about the nature of Trumps were revealed as the tale progressed; for example, Trumps are not limited to playing cards, but can be drawn on any surface. Corwin escaped from his dungeon cell after Dworkin materialized in it, by persuading Dworkin, who was mentally unbalanced at the time, to draw him a picture of the lighthouse at Cabra, a location on the edge of Amber.  After Dworkin draws another picture to return to his hideout, Corwin uses the lighthouse picture to escape.  In The Hand of Oberon Corwin returns to his cell and uses the other picture to follow Dworkin to his lair, finding that it is in located near the Primal Pattern that created Amber and all its Shadows.

Dworkin taught several of his descendants to create Trumps, and other initiates of the Pattern or Logrus can be trained in that skill. If one looks "closely enough" at a Trump, one can see parts of the Pattern or Logrus within its design, which may provide a source of power.

Anyone may use a Trump – the user does not need to be an Amberite, a Pattern initiate, or of royal blood. Similarly, no special characteristics are required in the person depicted on a Trump – for example, in Blood of Amber, several initiates of the Logrus were depicted on Trump cards drawn by Brand or Rinaldo, and Merlin considered drawing a Trump depicting Bill Roth, a trusted advisor with no apparent magical aptitude. Provided the artist is sufficiently familiar with the subject, a Trump can be drawn for any person or place desired, unless the place is in constant motion and change (such as portions of Chaos). Under certain circumstances and extreme conditions, the technique for creating a Trump can be used to make contact without drawing on any surface at all. Indeed, Corwin's brother Brand is described as becoming a "Living Trump", who can move through Shadow by will alone.

The Jewel of Judgement
A large red gem in a pendant, this is initially thought to be one of Oberon's tools that can be used to control the weather in Amber. In The Guns of Avalon, Eric uses it to summon storms against the dark forces attacking Amber, but is mortally injured. After Corwin's forces annihilate the attackers, Eric reveals that he became attuned to the Jewel by walking the Pattern in Amber and then projecting himself into its core. Corwin does this, and discovers other effects, such as a sapping of his energies and a tendency for time to slow down. The Jewel saves his life when he is stabbed in Amber, projecting him back to his old home on Earth where he lived as Carl Corey. Dworkin finally reveals that the Jewel contains within it the original Pattern from which he created Amber. Corwin, fearing that Amber has been destroyed in The Courts of Chaos, repeats this process in Shadow to create his own Pattern, using its power to project him to the Courts where he witnesses the final battle against Chaos and Brand, who took the Jewel while he was incapacitated after creating his Pattern. Apparently lost during the battle when Brand falls into the abyss, the Jewel is returned by the Unicorn and given to Random, making him the new King in Amber.

Spikards and Weapons
In the fictional Amber multiverse a spikard is a type of magical object with hyperdimensional "lines of power" which connect it to sorcerous power caches in various universes. In the Amber novels and short stories two shapes of spikards are explicitly cited: rings and swords. Benedict's metal arm is never explicitly listed as a spikard, but it does share with Corwin's spikard sword Grayswandir the rare magical ability to bypass an existential barrier of intangibility.

Corwin's sword, Grayswandir, contains a part of the Pattern like the Trumps. The sword appears in The Guns of Avalon, in which Corwin, having escaped from his imprisonment, draws it from the trunk of a tree, noting that while it was previously in Amber, it was now with him, suggesting that it can be manifested wherever he needs it. Grayswandir has power against dark forces such as those besieging Lorraine in The Guns of Avalon.  

In the Merlin cycle, Grayswandir has a counterpart in Werewindle, formerly Brand's sword. Like Grayswandir, Werewindle also bears a portion of the Pattern upon its blade. In The Salesman's Tale the golden-colored spikard sword Werewindle possesses sentient intelligence. Werewindle is also labelled as the Day Sword, compared to Ferdinand Holthausen's translation of the name Aurvandill/Auriwandal as "daybreak sword".

Corwin's brother Benedict is introduced in The Guns of Avalon as having lost his right arm in battle with the same dark forces menacing all of Shadow. In Sign of the Unicorn Corwin encounters Benedict's ghost in Tir na Nog'th. The ghost is wearing a remarkable prosthetic metal arm that can reach through unreality and attack him, even as Grayswandir can reach Benedict's ghost. Corwin strikes the arm from the ghost and returns to Amber with it. Later it is given to Benedict by Random, who performs the surgery to attach it. In the next novel this proves invaluable as the arm can overcome Brand's magic, allowing Benedict to strangle him despite being paralyzed, forcing Brand to vanish leaving the Jewel of Judgement behind. In The Courts of Chaos the arm is returned whence it came in a ghostly re-enactment of Corwin's fight with Benedict's ghost, occurring in the halls of Amber itself. These events are suspected to be caused by Oberon himself.

Literary influences

Inspirations and sources
The 1946 novel The Dark World by Henry Kuttner was acknowledged by Zelazny as an inspiration for his Amber novels. Similarities appear in the theme and in specific instances: some character names are common to both works, and they share the fantasy literary device of moving a present day, realistic character from the familiar world into a fantastical, alternate reality world, exposing the character to this shift as the reader experiences it. Zelazny is quoted as saying:

Zelazny openly admitted that the series was also inspired by Philip José Farmer's World of Tiers series, specifically the concepts of an immensely powerful family in a deadly rivalry over the fate of multiple universes.

Given Zelazny's academic interest in the Medieval European period, it is not a stretch to see a possible influence in Henry Adams' 1905 work Mont Saint-Michel and Chartres, wherein he discusses the building of Chartres Cathedral, and the tidal-islet of Mont Saint-Michel, on the Normandy coast of France. However, these possible influences are not supported by Zelazny's own commentary about the origins of the Pattern. He indicated that he loosely based the Pattern in part on the Tree of Life or Sephiroth of Kaballah, and preferred to allow the reader to imagine what the actual Pattern looked like.

More generally, the series draws from many mythological sources as inspirations, especially Celtic (see Tír na nÓg), Norse mythology, and Arthurian legend. Zelazny cited Jessie L. Weston's 1921 book From Ritual to Romance as a key influence: it examined the pagan and Christian roots of the legends of King Arthur, the Wasteland myths, and the Holy Grail. For example, the Celtic Wasteland myth ties the barrenness of a land to a curse that a hero must lift; Corwin's curse is in part responsible for the Black Road.

Philosophical texts have influenced the series as well: many similarities exist between Amber and Plato's Republic (see the Allegory of the cave) and the classical problems of metaphysics, virtuality, solipsism, logic, possible worlds, probability, doubles and essences are also repeatedly reflected on.

Sometimes the references made by Zelazny could be considered foreshadowing. For example, the name Ganelon was taken from the Matter of France, a body of classic French legends and literature that includes the Song of Roland. Throughout the Matter of France, Ganelon was often called "Ganelon the Traitor"; thus, for readers familiar with the original Ganelon, Zelazny's use of the name foreshadowed events in The Hand of Oberon where Ganelon purposefully loses a battle to spite Corwin. In the Song of Roland, Ganelon was also the stepfather of the protagonist Roland, which Zelazny may have used to foreshadow the relationship between Corwin and Ganelon at the conclusion of The Hand of Oberon.

Allusions to Shakespeare
Throughout the Chronicles, Zelazny alludes extensively to plays by William Shakespeare. It is not stated in the series whether the characters (who are usually well-read) are merely paraphrasing the bard for their own amusement, or if Shakespeare himself was telling stories that are reflections of Amber's history and future. It is implied that both variants are true simultaneously. The allusions include:
 Oberon, the King of Amber, is also the name of King of the Fairies from A Midsummer Night's Dream, although Shakespeare did not invent the character.
 The Forest of Arden is also the setting of Shakespeare's As You Like It.
 There are greater thematic allusions in the Chronicles, mostly to Hamlet. Corwin describes himself at the beginning of The Courts of Chaos as the "mad prince" of Amber, drawing a parallel between himself and the mad prince of Denmark. In addition, Corwin is contacted by the "ghost" of Oberon several times (before realizing that Oberon still lives), an obvious parallel to the plot of Hamlet. When dining with Lorraine, Corwin even refers to the attempted Trump contact by Oberon as a message from his "father's ghost".
 The rivalry between Corwin and Eric roughly parallels the Wars of the Roses, as portrayed in Shakespeare's "Wars of the Roses" cycle. Corwin's symbol, a silver rose, echoes the House of York's symbol, a white rose, and Eric's chosen color, red, echoes the House of Lancaster's symbol, a red rose.
 "Ill-met by moonlight", Deirdre's response to her rescue in Nine Princes in Amber (chapter 4): "Ill met by moonlight, proud Titania", is said by Oberon in A Midsummer Night's Dream.
 "To sleep, perchance to dream... Yeah, there's a thing that rubs", Corwin muses in Nine Princes in Amber (chapter 6). "To sleep: perchance to dream: ay, there's the rub", is from the To be, or not to be soliloquy in Hamlet.
 Very early in Nine Princes in Amber Corwin thinks to himself, "In the state of Denmark there was the odor of decay", a reference to "Something is rotten in the state of Denmark", a famous line from Hamlet.
 When Corwin first meets Eric in Nine Princes in Amber, Eric complains "It's true, that uneasy-lies-the-head bit". "Uneasy lies the head that wears a crown" is the final line in a monologue spoken by Henry IV in Act III, Scene i, of Henry IV, part 2 wherein Henry is pondering how sleep comes to even the most humble peasant easier than it does to the great.
 When he receives Eric's offer of peace in The Guns of Avalon, Corwin muses "...I believe you, never doubt it, for we are all of us honorable men" (chapter 8). In Marc Antony's funeral oration in Julius Caesar, he says, "For Brutus is an honourable man; So are they all; all honourable men".
 "So Childe Random to the dark tower came", Random recounts in his story of how he tried to rescue Brand. At the end of Act IV of King Lear, Edgar, disguised as the Poor Tom, the crazy beggar, babbles "Child Rowland to the dark tower came", an allusion itself to the fairy tale of Childe Rowland.
 Corwin, when describing the royal family to Ganelon in Sign of the Unicorn, says that Oberon had two other sons with Benedict's mother Cymnea, the first being Osric, who shares his name with a courtier in Hamlet.
 "Good night, sweet Prince", Brand says to Benedict in The Hand of Oberon (chapter 13). These are the words that Horatio speaks at the death of Hamlet.
 After watching his "dream" from Tir-na Nog'th play out in Amber in The Courts of Chaos (chapter 1), Corwin muses, "I looked back once to the empty place where my dream had come true. Such is the stuff". He alludes to Act IV, scene 1 of The Tempest, where, after causing spirits he has summoned to disappear, Prospero delivers the famous speech that includes the line "We are such stuff / As dreams are made on, and our little life / Is rounded by a sleep".

Television rights and development 
In July 2016, Skybound Entertainment announced that it was developing The Chronicles of Amber as a television project under Disney-ABC Domestic Television with Walking Dead creator and producer Robert Kirkman as an executive producer. Kirkman stated that "Chronicles of Amber is one of my favorite book series of all time, and one of my main inspirations for working in film and television. Getting to produce this project is the fulfillment of a lifelong dream. I can't wait to share this amazing story with a new generation of fans".

In August 2017, Kirkman and Skybound announced an agreement with Amazon to develop television projects to debut exclusively on Prime Video with distribution under Disney-ABC Domestic Television, without identifying any specific project as part of the deal. In January 2023, The Hollywood Reporter announced that the production company Spartina had joined Skybound Entertainment and Vincent Newman Entertainment’s existing partnership to develop the works into a drama series.

References

External links

 The Amber mailing-list FAQ
 Series profile at Internet Book List
 The Dying of Ember (Amber parody)
 The Chronicles of Amber at Worlds Without End

 
Fantasy books by series
Novels about parallel universes
Fictional universes